This is a timeline of Pakistani history, comprising important legal and territorial changes and political events in today's Pakistan and its predecessor states. To read about the background of these events, see History of Pakistan and History of the Islamic Republic of Pakistan.


Lower Paleolithic

Middle Paleolithic

Upper Paleolithic

35th century BCE

27th century BCE

25th century BCE

19th century BCE

13th century BCE

10th century BCE

7th century BCE

6th century BCE

5th century BCE

4th century BCE

2nd century BCE

1st century BCE

1st century

2nd century

3rd century

4th century

5th century

6th century

7th century

8th century

9th century

10th century

11th century

12th century

13th century

14th century

CE
 1351: Samma Dynasty assumed rule over Sindh
 1398: Tamerlane plunders Lahore
 1472: Sher Shah Suri (original name Farid Khan born in Multan)
 1526 – 1857: Mughal ascendancy (1526–1707), nominal rule by Mughals (1707–1857)
 1541 – 1545: Sher Shah Suri built the Rohtas Fort
 1586: Yusufzais defeat Akbar in the Karakar pass
 1701: Kalhoro Dynasty establishes its rule over Sindh
 1739: Nadir Shah of Persia invades Mughal Empire
 1751–52: Ahmed Shah Abdali annexes Punjab to his kingdom
 1758–59: Maratha conquest of North-west India
 1782: The Baloch tribe of Talpur defeats the last Kalhora ruler Mian Abdul Nabi in the battle of Halani
 12 April 1801— 27 June 1839: Sikhs become dominant force in Punjab, Ranjit Singh rules (1799–1839),
 1843: British defeat Talpurs in the battle of Miani and annex Sindh
 29 March 1849: British defeat Sikhs and annex Punjab
 1 November 1857 The British control most present-day Pakistan region and incorporate it as part of the British Indian Empire.
 30 December 1906: A new political party All-India Muslim League formed to protect rights of Muslims in British Indian Empire.
 1909: Muhammad Ali Jinnah was elected to the Legislative Council in 1909
 1913: Prominent Muslim leader Muhammad Ali Jinnah, acknowledging that Hindu dominant Indian Congress failing to protect Indian Muslim rights, joined the All India Muslim League (AIML). Now he was member of both the political parties, later became leader of the All-India Muslim League and instrumental in the creation of Pakistan.
 1920: Having disagreement with Gandhi on the issue of Swaraj (self-rule), complete freedom from the British and on using extra-constitutional means, Jinnah resigned from the Congress in 1920
1921: 
 MAO College Aligarh upgraded to Aligrah Muslim University
 29 December 1930: Dr. Muhammad Allama Iqbal, a great Muslim philosopher and poet suggested creation of separate Muslim state in Indian sub-continent to protect Muslim population dominated by Hindu majority.
 31 May 1935: A strong earthquake with a magnitude of 7.7 jolted Quetta killing over 50,000 people
 14 August 1947: Pakistan is created.

Post-Independence

1940s 
3 June 1947: British Government decides to separate British India, into two sovereign Dominions of India and Pakistan.
8 July Constituent Assembly of Pakistan approves the design of Pakistan.
26 July: The Gazette of India publishes that the first Constituent Assembly of Pakistan was given shape with 69 members (later on the membership was increased to 79), including one female member. 
 14 August: Pakistan became independent. Quaid-a-Azam took oath as the first Governor General of Pakistan. Liaqat Ali Khan took oath as the first Prime minister of Pakistan.
30 September: Pakistan becomes a member of the UN by a unanimous vote of the Security Council.
27 October: Indian Air troops land in Kashmir as the Maharajah declares accession of Kashmir to India. 
1 January: UNO cease-fire orders to operate in Kashmir. War stops accordingly.
1 May: Indo-Pakistani War of 1947, Pakistan enters war on behalf of Kashmir against India.
1 July: Quaid-e-Azam inaugurated the State Bank of Pakistan.
11 September 1948: Muhammad Ali Jinnah, the first governor general of Pakistan, passes away.
1 January: United Nations Cease-fire Line established between Pakistan Administered Kashmir (GB & AJ&K) and Indian-held Kashmir
8 February: Azad Kashmir Government shifts its capital to Muzaffarabad.
12 March 1949 : Objectives Resolution passed by Liaquat Ali Khan.
14 September: Khwaja Nazimuddin becomes 2nd Governor-General of Pakistan.

1950s 
11 July 1950 Pakistan joins the International Monetary Fund and World Bank.
 16 October 1951: First Prime Minister Liaqat Ali Khan assassinated in Liaqat National Bagh, Rawalpindi.
 17 October 1951: Finance Minister Malik Ghulam Mohammad (1895–1956) of Muslim League becomes the third Governor General. Governor-General Khawaja Nazimuddin of Muslim League becomes the second Prime Minister.
 21 August 1951: Pakistan and India agree on the boundary pact between East Bengal and West Bengal.
 22 August 1951: A 24-hour telegraph telephone service is established between East Pakistan and West Pakistan.
 24 December 1951: UN Security Council adopts the Anglo-American Resolution on Kashmir urging immediate demilitarization talks between India, Pakistan.
 17 April 1953: Muhammad Ali Bogra is sworn as prime minister.
 7 August 1954: Government of Pakistan approves the National Anthem, written by Abu Al-Asar Hafeez Jalandhari and composed by Ahmed G. Chagla.
 21 September 1954: Constituent Assembly unanimously passes the resolution in favour of Urdu and Bengali as national languages.
 24 October: 1954 Malik Ghulam Muhammad dissolved first constitutional assembly.
 1955: Constitutional crisis, Mohammad Ali Bogra removed, new assembly, new cabinet.
7 August 1955: PM Mohammad Ali Bogra resigns after the election of Chaudhri Mohammad Ali.
 6 October 1955: Governor-General Ghulam Mohammad's resignation is succeeded by Iskander Mirza.
 1956: The Constituent Assembly promulgates first indigenous constitution
 1956: Constituent Assembly decides the country shall be a Federal Republic known as Islamic Republic of Pakistan
 16 December 1957: Malik Firoz Khan Noon is sworn in as seventh Prime Minister of Pakistan.
 7 October 1958: After a military coup dictorial Ayub Khan takes over.
18 April 1959: The government takes over dailies The Pakistan Times, Imroze and weekly Lail-o-Nihar.

1960s 
 1960: Ayub Khan becomes first elected president
 1 August 1960: Islamabad is declared as the principal seat of the Government of Pakistan.
 8 June 1962: 1962 Constitution is promulgated. National Assembly elected. Ayub Khan takes oath of first President of Pakistan under new constitution.
 2 January 1964: Fatima Jinnah lost the presidential elections, Ayub completes the second term.
 6 September 1965: Second war between Pakistan and India over Kashmir.
 10 January 1966: Pakistan and Republic of India sign the Tashkent Declaration to end hostilities.
 30 November 1967: Pakistan Peoples Party founded by Zulfikar Ali Bhutto in Lahore.
 25 March 1969: Ayub Khan resigns; Yahya Khan declares martial law and assumes presidency.

1970s 
 7 December 1970: 1970 Pakistani general election were held on 7 December 1970, although the polls in East Pakistan, originally scheduled for October, were delayed by disastrous floods and rescheduled for later in December and January 1971.
 1971: East Pakistan attempts to secede, leading to civil war; India intervenes in support of East Pakistanis; Pakistan fights another war with India; East Pakistan breaks away to become Bangladesh;
 20 December 1971: Yahya Khan resigns.
 1972: Karachi labour unrest of 1972 and Zulfiqar Ali Bhutto becomes president.
 14 March 1972: New education policy enforced. Free education in all private and public schools.
 21 April 1972: Martial Law lifted; constitutional rule is restored in the country. Hamoodur Rahman is sworn in as Chief Justice of Pakistan.
  10 April 1973: 1973 Constitution of Pakistan enacted by the National Assembly.
 11 August 1973: Chaudhry Fazal Ilahi is elected as president.
 14 August 1973: Zulfiqar Ali Bhutto becomes prime minister.  Constitution of Pakistan 1973 promulgated.
 7 March 1977: 1977 Pakistani general election
 5 July 1977: General Muhammad Zia ul-Haq overthrows prime minister Zulfiqar Ali Bhutto and declares martial law.
 11 June 1978: Altaf Hussain founded the All Pakistan Muhajir Student Organization (APMSO) in Karachi University.
 16 September 1978: General Muhammad Zia ul-Haq becomes Pakistan's sixth president.
 1979: The military ruler Zia Ul-Haq enacts the Hudood Ordinances.
 4 April 1979: Zulfiqar Ali Bhutto hanged.

1980s 
 26 May 1980: Establishment of Federal Shariat Court is announced.
 23 March 1981: Provisional constitutional order enforced, replacing the 1973 constitution.
 18 March 1984: Azeem Ahmed Tariq & Altaf Hussain founded the MQM (Muhajir Qaumi Movement) in Karachi and Hyderabad.
 28 February 1985: General elections held; Muhammad Khan Junejo becomes prime minister.
 31 December 1985: Martial Law is lifted, amended 1973 Constitution revived.
 20 January 1988: Prominent Pashtun leader Khan Abdul Ghaffar Khan dies in Peshawar.
 10 April 1988: Army ammunition blown up in Ojheri camp, Rawalpindi; more than 100 people die.
 29 May 1988: Zia dismisses Junejo's government; 
 17 August 1988: General Zia-ul-Haq is killed in a plane crash near Bahawalpur.
 16 November 1988: New elections held; Benazir Bhutto becomes prime minister
 30 September 1988: 1988 Hyderabad massacre
 16 November 1988: 1988 Pakistani general election

1990s 
 6 August 1990: President Ghulam Ishaq Khan dismisses Benazir Bhutto government; Mian Nawaz Sharif becomes the next prime minister

 24 October 1990: 1990 Pakistani general election

 1991: Prime Minister Nawaz Sharif begins economic liberalisation programme. 
 16 May 1991: Islamic Shariah law formally incorporated into legal code.
 19 June 1992: Pakistan Army started Operation Clean-up
 18 July 1993: President Ghulam Ishaq Khan and Prime Minister Nawaz Sharif both resign under pressure from military. Benazir Bhutto becomes prime minister for the second time.
 5 November 1996: President Farooq Leghari dismisses Bhutto government.
 3 February 1997: 1997 Pakistani general election, Nawaz Sharif becomes prime minister for the second time.

  28 May 1998: Pakistan conducts nuclear tests.
 26 July 1999: Kargil War ends between Pakistan and India. 
 12 October 1999: Prime Minister Nawaz Sharif overthrown in military coup led by General Pervez Musharraf.

2000s 
6 April 2000: Supreme Court validated the October 1999 coup and granted General Pervez Musharraf executive and legislative authority for three years.

2001 
 20 June: General Pervez Musharraf dismissed the president and named himself to the post.
 15 July: Agra Summit starts. President Pervez Musharraf and Indian Prime Minister Vajpayee holds talks over long-standing issues.
 14 August: New Local Government system installed, after holding of elections in three phases.
 16 September: US Secretary of State Powell told that Pakistan's President Musharraf had agreed to support the U.S. anti-terrorist campaign.
 10 November: US President Bush meets President Musharraf in New York and assures additional aid of one billion dollars.

2002 
 5 January: Musharraf stunned Vajpayee by a hand-shake at the last 11th SAARC summit in Kathmandu.
 1 February: Wall Street Journal reporter, Daniel Pearl killed in Karachi.
 16 March: War in North-West Pakistan begins.
 30 April: General Pervez Musharraf wins a referendum thus ensures 5 more years in office.
 8 May: 2002 Karachi bus bombing, 15 killed.
 24 August: President General Musharraf issues the Legal Framework Order 2002.
 10 October: 2002 Pakistani general election, First general elections since the 1999 military coup held.
 23 November: Mir Zafarullah Khan Jamali sworn in as Prime Minister.

2003 
 24 February: Senate elections: Ruling party wins most seats in voting to the upper house.
 23 March: AAJ TV, Pakistan's premier channel inaugurated.
 24 June: President Pervez Musharraf meets US President G.W. Bush in Camp David. US announces $3-billion five-year economic assistance package for Pakistan.
 4 July: 2003 Quetta mosque bombing, 44 killed.
 11 July: Lahore-Delhi bus service resumed after suspension of 18 months.
 14 December: General Musharraf survived an assassination attempt in Rawalpindi.

2004 
 1 January: General Musharraf won a vote of confidence in the Senate, National Assembly, and provincial assemblies.
 5 January: Musharraf meets Vajpayee in Islamabad, discusses Kashmir dispute.
 22 May: Pakistan readmitted to Commonwealth.
 26 June: Prime Minister Zafarullah Khan Jamali steps down and nominates Ch. Shujaat Hussain as his interim successor.
 28 August: Shaukat Aziz becomes Prime Minister.

2005

2007 
 3–11 July: Siege of Lal Masjid
 19 October: 2007 Karsaz bombing, 180 killed.
 4 September: September 2007 bombings in Rawalpindi, 25 killed.
 3 November: Pervez Musharraf imposed emergency, most of the senior judges of Supreme Court ousted.
 27 December: Benazir Bhutto assassinated, aged 54. (b. 1953)

2008 
 9 February: 2008 Charsadda bombing, 27 killed.
 6 July: 2008 Lal Masjid bombing, 18 policeman killed and 1 civilian.
 18 August: Pervez Musharraf resigns.
 21 August: 2008 Wah bombing, 70 killed.

2009 
 16 February: Pakistan government announces a truce with Taliban, accepting a system of Islamic law in the Swat valley, conceding the area as a Taliban sanctuary.
 9 March: Militants attack bus with the touring Sri Lankan cricket team. All international cricket matches in Pakistan are suspended. Pakistan also loses its status as hosts for the 2011 Cricket World Cup.
 16 March: As the result of long march Lawyers' Movement succeeded. Iftikhar Mohammed Chaudhry was restored as Chief Justice of Pakistan and other judges dismissed by Musharraf.
 27 March: 2009 Jamrud mosque bombing, 48–70 killed.
 23 May: Pakistan Army launched Operation Rah-e-Rast and cleared Swat valley of all Taliban elements. It is regarded as one of the most successful counter-insurgency operations in modern age (to 15 July)
 4 April: 2009 Islamabad Frontier Corps post bombing, 5 killed.
 5 April: 2009 Chakwal mosque bombing, more than 30 killed.
 9 June: Pearl Continental hotel bombing, 17 killed.
 20 October: 2009 International Islamic University bombing, 4 killed.
 2 November: November 2009 Rawalpindi bombing, 35 killed.
 4 December: December 2009 Rawalpindi attack, 40 killed.

2010s

2010 
 10 January: January 2010 Bajaur bombing, 16 killed.
 3 February: February 2010 Lower Dir bombing, 8 killed.
 5 February: February 2010 Karachi bombings, 25 killed.
 18 February: February 2010 Khyber mosque bombing, 30 killed.
 12 March: Lahore church bombings, more than 72 killed.
 5 April: April 2010 U.S consulate and ANP attack, 50 killed.
 5 April: 2010 Timergarah bombings, 46 killed.
 10 April: Pakistan adopts the 18th amendment to the Constitution, stripping President Asif Ali Zardari of key powers.
 17 April: April 2010 Kohat bombings, 58 killed.
 19 April: 19 April 2010 Peshawar bombing. 25 killed.
 28 May: 2010 Ahmadiyya mosques massacre, 87 killed.
 1 July: July 2010 Lahore bombings, 50 killed.
 9 July: Mohmand Agency bombing, 104 killed.
 1 September: September 2010 Lahore bombings, 38 killed.
 3 September: September 2010 Quetta bombing, 73 killed.
 5 November: 2010 Darra Adam Khel mosque bombing, 66 killed.
 25 December: December 2010 Bajaur bombing, 47 killed.

2011 
 3 April: 2011 Dera Ghazi Khan bombings, more than 50 killed.
 2 May:  The US Navy Seals killed Osama bin Laden in the city of Abbotabad.
 12 June: June 2011 Peshawar bombings, more than 34 were killed.
 July – August: Mass target killing occurred killing ~344 people throughout Karachi.
 19 August: 2011 Khyber Agency bombing, more than 48 killed.

2012 
 26 February: Sharmeen Obaid-Chinoy won her first Academy Award for Best Documentary Short Subject for Saving Face, becoming the very first Pakistani Oscar winner
. 22 June: Raja Pervaiz Ashraf is elected as Prime Minister of Pakistan, following the disqualification of Yousaf Raza Gillani over a contempt of court conviction by the Supreme Court of Pakistan.

2013 
 10 January: January 2013 Pakistan bombings, 130 killed.
 7 May: 7 May 2013 Syed Janan election rally bombing, 18–25 killed.
 11 May: 2013 Pakistani general election held
 5 June: Nawaz Sharif is elected Prime Minister of Pakistan, following the Pakistan Muslim League (N)'s victory in the 2013 general elections for the 3rd time.
 15 June: June 2013 Quetta attacks, 26 killed.
 18 June: 2013 Mardan funeral bombing, 28 killed.
 21 June: 2013 Peshawar mosque bombing, 15 killed.
 30 July: Mamnoon Hussain is elected as the 12th President of Pakistan in 2013 Presidential elections.
 8 August: August 2013 Quetta bombing, 31 killed.
 22 September: Peshawar church bombing, 127 killed.
 29 September: Qissa Khawani Bazaar bombing, 41 killed.

2014 
 7 January: Aitzaz Hasan died between Preventing suicide bomber attack at his school in Hangu District, sacrificed his own life to save the lives of hundreds of his mates.
 19 January: 2014 Bannu bombing, 26 killed.
 19 January: 2014 Rawalpindi suicide bombing, 14 killed.
 2–11 February: 2014 Peshawar cinema bombings, 13 killed.
 3 March: Islamabad court attack, 11 killed.
 10 October: October 10: Activist Malala Yousafzai becomes the first Pakistani to win the Nobel Peace Prize for her struggle to voice girls' right to education.
 2 November: 2014 Wagah border suicide attack, 60 killed.
 16 December: 2014 Peshawar school massacre, 148 killed.

2015 
 13 February: 2015 Peshawar mosque attack, 19 killed.
 15 March: Lahore church bombings, 19 killed.
 23 October: 2015 Jacobabad bombing, 22 killed.

2016 
 20 January: Bacha Khan University attack, 20 killed.
 28 February: Sharmeen Obaid-Chinoy won her second Academy Award for Best Documentary Short Subject for A Girl in the River: The Price of Forgiveness
 16 March: 2016 Peshawar bus bombing, 15 killed
 27 March: 2016 Lahore suicide bombing, 75 killed.
 16 September: 2016 September Pakistan mosque bombing, 36 killed.
 24 October: 2016 Peshawar bus bombing, 62 killed.
 12 November: 2016 Khuzdar bombing, 47 killed.

2017 
 21 January: A bombing at a vegetable market in Parachinar, Pakistan leads to the death of 25 people.
 9 February: 2017 Pakistan Super League began.

2018 
 24-27 May: The twenty-fifth amendment to the Constitution of Pakistan was approved by the Parliament of Pakistan and the Provincial Assembly of Khyber Pakhtunkhwa (KP), giving way to the merger of the Federally Administered Tribal Areas into the Province of Khyber Pakhtunkhwa.
 25 July: 2018 Pakistani general election are held.

2019 
 26 February: Officially spurns Indian claims of Balakot airstrike
 27 February: Pakistan Air Force shoots down two Indian warplanes in a skirmish and captured Indian pilot wing commander Abhinandan Varthaman
 2 March: Pakistan released Abhinandan Varthaman and returned him to India in a simple ceremony via Wagha border.
5 August: India revoked article 370 of the constitution and partitioned the state of Jammu and Kashmir.
14 December: Named the top holiday destination for travelers for the year 2020 by the United States-based luxury and lifestyle publication Conde Nast Traveler.

See also 
 Pakistan
 History of Pakistan
 Timeline of Karachi
 Timeline of Lahore
 Timeline of Peshawar

References

Bibliography

External links

 National Fund For Cultural Heritage
 History Of Pakistan

 01
Pakistan
 01